The Pensacola Police Department (or PPD) is the primary law enforcement agency for Pensacola, Florida in the United States.

History

Early history
The department was founded on July 19, 1821, by Gen. Andrew Jackson, who had appointed city constable (policeman) to keep order within the city.  On July 17, Jackson had entered Pensacola to accept the territory of East and West Florida for the United States.  The following day, he established the government within the city. The history of the Pensacola Police Department goes back to the finding of Pensacola led by Tristan De Luna. When De Luna was establishing Pensacola with more than a 1,500 people they needed protection from future invaders and any other possible threats, so they built Fort Barrancas. The establishment did not last long because of the hurricanes that hit the area. Many tried to re-establish what was the settlement of De Luna. So in 1692 Admiral Andre de Pez claimed the area that was known by the Native Americans as Panzacola. The Spanish fought for this area and was claimed by the Spanish, French, and English (all in separate times of history). Later on Fort Pickens and Fort San Miguel was established.

Later history
Later on in Pensacola's history many of the soldiers that had fought in the many battles and wars of Pensacola established the Pensacola Police Department. Many rules for the police officers were also established including the following:
 Officers could not sit down while on duty.
 Officers could not drink "spirituous liquor" in the police station.
 Officers had to be able to read and write in English, never have been indicted and convicted of a crime, of physical health and vigor, of good moral character, and of unquestionable energy.
 The more intelligent officers were stationed on the main streets.
 An officer could not use his club or pistol except when he was protecting his life or if someone showed resistance.
 An officer could not leave his beat unless he was taking an arrestee to the police station or for an emergency.
 Officers could not visit bar rooms while on- or off-duty.
 An officer could not be absent for roll call more than three times a month.

Departmental organization
Currently the PPD has approximately 155 sworn police officers divided into four divisions. There are sections and units within each of the following divisions:

The Uniform Patrol Division (UPD) is the largest and most visible. These officers are the Department's quick response unit and are most likely to answer emergency calls for help. UPD contains the sections of Traffic, Airport, and K-9. Within the Traffic Section, officers are assigned to the Motorcycle Unit, D.U.I. Unit, Hit & Run Investigations, or the Retail District. The officers within the Traffic Section are also specialized and tasked to investigate all Traffic Homicide (Fatality) crashes occurring within the city limits. The Airport Section has officers assigned to protect and safeguard the Pensacola International Airport. The Retail District has officers assigned to the heavily traveled retail district of the city limits. These officers provide a visible presence and support Patrol by answering calls for service in and around the retail district.  
The Operational Support  Division (OSD) is tasked with solving long-term problems and disseminating information to the public through Neighborhood Watch meetings and the like. This division also includes the Bicycle Unit, School Resource Officers, Community Policing Unit, Community Redevelopment Agency area officers, Records, vehicles, computer systems, facilities, and Evidence.
The Criminal Investigations Division (CID) provides follow-up on reported crimes and is responsible for long-term investigations. Within this division is the Crime Scene Unit, Vice & Narcotics Unit, and Special Investigations Unit. 
The Administrative Division (Admin.) contains the Chief’s Office, Professional Standards, Budgeting, Payroll, Public Relations, Training and Accreditation, as well as some other support functions.

Canine unit
The Pensacola Police Department is recognized as having one of the best-trained canine units in the United States.  At the annual USPCA Police Dog Field Trials—the largest competition of police dogs in the United States—Pensacola police dog "Uno" took second place in the 2013 competition, and "Charief" took fourth place in 2012.

Leadership and ranks
The current chief of police is Eric Randall. The head of the department is the chief of police. The current chief of police, Eric Randall, assumed the role on June 14, 2021, and prior to being hired in Pensacola, Chief Randall was the assistant chief of police at Newport News, Virginia, Police Department.

The previous chief of police, Tommi Lyter, retired from the department after serving with the Pensacola Police Department for 30 years. Retired chief of police Tommi Lyter took over the roll of chief deputy  for Escambia County Sheriff's Office on January 5, 2021.

Rank structure
The Rank Structure of the Pensacola Police Department is as follows:

See also

References

External links
Pensacola Police Department - Official Website
Pensacola Police Department - Employment Opportunities

Municipal police departments of Florida
Pensacola, Florida